Brachychiton xanthophyllus is a tree of the genus Brachychiton found in northwestern Australia. It was described in 1988.

Notes

References

xanthophyllus
Malvales of Australia
Trees of Australia
Ornamental trees
Drought-tolerant trees
Plants described in 1988